Thomas Fawcett Wray (1827 – 6 September 1877) was an Australian cricketer. He played in three first-class cricket matches for Victoria between 1858 and 1860.

See also
 List of Victoria first-class cricketers

References

1827 births
1877 deaths
Australian cricketers
Victoria cricketers
People from Richmondshire (district)
English players of Australian rules football
Melbourne Cricket Club cricketers
Melbourne Football Club (pre-VFA) players